Society of honor may refer to:

 Honor society, a rank organization that recognizes excellence among peers
 A culture of honor (see )